Randy Phillip Boyd (born March 23, 1954) is a Republican politician who has served since 2012 as a member of the Mississippi House of Representatives for the 19th District in Mantachie in northeastern Mississippi.

Boyd graduated from Tremont High School in rural Tremont in Itawamba County, Mississippi and then attended Itawamba Community College in Fulton. He graduated from Mississippi State University at Starkville. For more than three decades, he has been engaged in the forestry industry and is a partner in LandTree LLC. He resides in Mantachie in Itawamba County.

In 2018 Boyd was among several representatives who were in opposition to introducing a state lottery in Mississippi. He is a member of the state's task force on education.

References

External links
 Randy Boyd at Vote Smart

1954 births
Living people
Republican Party members of the Mississippi House of Representatives
People from Russellville, Alabama
People from Itawamba County, Mississippi
Itawamba Community College alumni
Mississippi State University alumni
21st-century American politicians